The Ibanez Talman series of guitars consists of various electric and acoustic models. Introduced in 1994, initial production of the electric guitar models ended in 1998. In 2003, the first in a line of a group of acoustic and acoustic-electric guitars debuted. Other than the Noodles Signature Models of electric guitar, Ibanez introduced a new line of Talman electric guitar models in November 2015, including Standard and Prestige versions.

Models

Electric models

TC series 
 TC530 (Produced in 1994)
 TC620 (Produced between 1995–1996)
 TC630 (Produced between 1995–1997)
 TC730 (Produced in 1996)
 TC820 (Produced in 1996)
 TC830 (Produced in 1996)
 TC420 (Produced between 1995–1998)
 TC740 (Produced between 1997–1998)
 TC825 (Produced between 1997–1998)
 TC220 (Produced in 1998)
 TC720 (Produced in 1998)

TV series 
 TV650 (Produced in 1994)
 TV750 (Produced in 1994)
 TV550 (Produced in 1995)

TM Prestige series 
 TM1702 (Produced between 2015–2016)
 TM1702M (Produced between 2015–2017)
 TM1730 (Produced between 2015–2017)
 TM1730M (Produced between 2015–2017)
 TM1803M (Produced between 2015–2017)
 TM1702AHM (Produced between 2016–2017)
 TM1730AHM (Produced in 2016)
 TM1702P (Produced in 2017)
 TM1730P (Produced in 2017)

TM Standard series 
 TM302M (Produced between 2015–2017)
 TM330M (Produced between 2015–2017)
 TM302 (Produced between 2016–2017)
 TM302BM (Produced between 2016–2017)
 TM302HM (Produced between 2016–2017)
 TM302PM (Produced between 2016–2018)
 TM303M (Produced between 2016–2018)
 TM330P (Produced in 2017)

TM J-Line series 
 TM730 (Japan exclusive)

Signature models 
 PGM900 (Paul Gilbert signature model)
 NDM1, NDM2, NDM3, NDM4 & NDM5 (Noodles signature models)
 YY10 (Yvette Young signature model)

Acoustic models 
This series has been in production since 2003.
  TCY20VV
  TCY20TRS
  TCY15ERD
  TCY10ETBS
  TCY10EBK
  TCM50VBS
  TCY740 - a variant folk-configuration guitar. Mahogany body; nut and saddle in ivorex 2; X frame; Fishman Sonicore preamplifier. Two models: the first with a number ending by 1201, and a second ending by 1202. For the model ending by 1202, at least 834 units have been made in China. 2014 final year.

Players 
Artists known playing an Ibanez Talman are:
 Tom Morello (Rage Against the Machine) owns a custom Ibanez Talman with a Kenyan flag finish and a white one with 2 humbuckers.
 Noodles (The Offspring) has played different TC and TV Models from 1994 onward an has five signature Talman models; NDM1, NDM2 NDM3, NDM4, and NDM5
 Yvette Young (Covet) owns two Talman Prestige models along with the signature strat-style Talman YY10
 David Williams (Michael Jackson) owns an Ibanez Talman.
 Aron Garceau (Prydein) plays electric Talmans exclusively, mainly a Blue Sparkle TC825 and a Metallic Avocado TC620 and a Black TC420.
 Stefan Jacques from Dutch psycho-rock band Misery Kids plays a TV650.
 Will Salazar (Fenix TX) can be seen playing a Talman in their music video for "All My Fault."
 Rene van Lien from Dutch noise band Feverdream / Neon Rainbows plays a chocolate brown TC530.
 Thurston Moore and Kim Gordon (Sonic Youth), purchased after the gear theft in July 1999, still used occasionally by Kim.
 Bob 2 (formerly of Devo) played a green and red Talman from the 1990s up until his death in 2014.
 Shark (Wild Colonials) can be seen playing a black Ibanez Talman in their music video for the 1996 single "Charm".

References

External links 
 Bill Gaphardt's Ibanez Talmans page
 Ibanez.com | Acoustic guitars | TALMAN
 Bill Gaphardt's Ibanez Talmans gallery page

Talman